Los miserables (English: Les Misérables), is a telenovela that premiered on Telemundo on September 30, 2014, and concluded on March 24, 2015. The telenovela is produced by Argos Comunicación and Telemundo Studios, distributed by Telemundo Internacional and created by the Venezuelan author Valentina Párraga, based on the 1862 French novel Les Misérables written by Victor Hugo.

It stars Aracely Arámbula as Lucía Durán — A woman pursued by law but innocent, who has to resist, fight and hide tenaciously and cunningly, until she demonstrates her integrity, with Erik Hayser, Aylín Mújica, Gabriel Porras and Marco Treviño, along to Aarón Díaz as the special guest.

Plot 
Lucia Durán (Lucha) leaves prison in Texas (U.S.) where she served 11 years of her sentence, with the frustration of paying for a crime she did not commit. Her cellmate Rosalia Pérez, on her deathbed, entrusts Lucia to take charge of Roxana, her 10-year-old daughter living in Mexico City. Lucia is deported from Texas with a nursing degree obtained in prison. In Mexico City, dreaming of reuniting with her family, Lucia is received by Liliana Duran, her younger sister, who reminds her that she is the shame of the family, although Liliana knows that the tragedy of her sister started it. Meanwhile, they agree that Lucia is alone in this life and Lucia begins a long ordeal to find work and the girl that she promised to protect.

The handsome and masculine chief of the anti-narcotics department, Daniel Ponce, never has trouble getting occasional lovers, but isn't keen on lasting relationships. He seems cold and cynical, while he boasts of being fair and impartial. He relentlessly tracks evildoers, as in each of the criminals he sees his mother's killers.

Daniel, in his fight against drug trafficking and Marrero, the head of a drug cartel, directs an operation to catch a trafficking ring in a popular neighborhood, which injures both policemen and traffickers. Meanwhile, Lucia goes to a charity hospital to apply for a job. Shortly after, the wounded cop from Daniel's operation arrives. Trained for action, Lucia starts to help the poor staff of nurses and doctors, until Daniel arrives with orders and threats. Lucia confronts him and Daniel angrily asserts himself. Sister Amparo Ponce, seeing the ugly behavior of her nephew, decides to give Lucia a try, despite her unruly past. After getting the job, Lucia starts to seek Roxana, the daughter of Rosalia. in other the Side,a very handsome, hardworking and a very well experienced police officer named Julian from another city arrives, and starts working with Daniel. Actually Julian is the step-brother of Olegario Marrero, but he is completely against him, and always goes and talks to him to stop the dirty work but Marrero refuses. Julian on the otherside falls in love with Lucia, and Lucia also starts loving him, but He feels bad for Daniel, and he cuts the relationship. Julian is also poor because he lost his son Thomas in car-accident and he is broken for that and the Court did not charge the man who killed his son. and also There is Pablo Riobueno who is an undercover police officer who works as a farmer in Radames Echeveria's House, and also he loves Radames's wife Helena and has a relationship with her.

Production 
The telenovela will be shot in Mexico, Mintz also indicated that soon reveal the names of the actors and producers and the rest of the team to be in this production.
Arambula clarified that the new melodrama will not be a carbon copy of the novel. "Are you based in Les Misérables, but is adapted for television. It is not time, is now only based on history [everyone knows]. We will not make Los Miserables [always]," she said. Arambula confirmed she wanted to return to the small screen with a different role of "La Patrona" in the drama of the soap will be Miserable. It also confirms that she will return to work with the same production team "La Patrona". Said Marcos Santana, president of Telemundo International, Monday in a press conference in Cannes, France. "We are very proud because it comes from another great production that will anticipate our label and have excellent ratings". The telenovela production began in April 2014.

Cast

Main 

 Aracely Arámbula as Lucía "Lucha" Durán
 Erik Hayser as Daniel Ponce
 Aylín Mújica as Liliana Durán
 Gabriel Porras as Olegario Marrero "El Diablo" / Rafael Montes killed by Liliana Duran
 Aarón Díaz as César Mondragón
 Marco Treviño as Ignacio Durán
 Julian Moreno as Julian Ferrera "el Hierro"

Recurring 
 Alexandra de la Mora as Helena Durán
 Aldo Gallardo as Carlos Gallardo
 Diego Soldano as Pablo Riobueno
 Bianca Calderón as Deyanira Paredes
 Claudio Lafarga as Dr. Gonzalo Mallorca
 Estela Calderón as Déborah Echeverría
 Thanya López as Marisela León
 Macarena Oz as Roxana Pérez
 Gabo Anguiano as Guillermo Orlandes "Memin"
 Luis Uribe as Genaro Cabello
 Verónica Terán as Sor Amparo Ponce
 María Barbosa as Fernanda Monteagudo de Durán
 Gina Varela as Nancy
 Anastasia as Consuelo Durán
 Manola Diez as Ivanna Echeverría
 Alex Camargo as Abel Durán
 Eva Daniela as Victoria "Vicky" Gordillo
 Alberto Sanchez as Thomas Ferrera/Julian's son Killed by Genaro
 Dave Douglas as Octavio Mondragón
 Rodrigo Vidal as Gastón Gordillo
 Javier Díaz Dueñas as Radamés Echeverría

Guest 
 Gonzalo García Vivanco as Pedro Morales
 Elsy Reyes as Nuria Pérez
 Juan Martín Jauregui as Evaristo Rodríguez
 Federico Porras Jr. as Ignacio "Nachito" Echeverría Durán
 Geraldine Zinat as Sor Milagros
 Luis Yeverino as Gustavo Millán
 Tatiana Martínez as Soraya
 Eduardo Reza as Alejandro Verde

Awards and nominations

See also
 Adaptations of Les Misérables

References

External links 

American television series based on telenovelas
Telemundo telenovelas
2014 telenovelas
2014 American television series debuts
2014 Mexican television series debuts
2015 Mexican television series endings
Mexican telenovelas
Argos Comunicación telenovelas
2015 American television series endings
Mexican LGBT-related television shows
American telenovelas